Mohamad Zaquan Adha bin Abd. Radzak (born 3 August 1987) is a Malaysian professional footballer who plays as a forward for the Malaysia Super League club Negeri Sembilan and the Malaysia national team. He is the younger of a set of twins; his brother, Aidil Zafuan, is also a footballer.

Club career

Negeri Sembilan FA
Zaquan started representing the Negeri Sembilan FA football team in the 2004 SUKMA Games. He, with his twin brother, helped the team to win a gold medal in the 2004 SUKMA Games. In the 2005–06 season, he and his brother were promoted into the senior team, and Negeri Sembilan also won their first Malaysia Super League title.

His contract with Negeri Sembilan was scheduled to end at the end of the 2008 season. Zaquan and his brother had been attracting interest from several Slovakian top league clubs. He had confirmed that he and his brother would sign a contract with an unnamed Slovak Corgoň Liga team after the 2008 AFF Suzuki Cup. However, he and Aidil remained with Negeri Sembilan.

Malaysian Armed Forces
In December 2011, it was announced that Zaquan signed a contract with the Malaysia Premier League team, Malaysian Armed Forces FA. He has helped the club win the 2012 Malaysia Premier League title and reach the 2012 Malaysia Cup final before losing to Kelantan 3–2.

Johor Darul Ta'zim
For the 2013 season, Zaquan joined the rebranded club Johor Darul Ta'zim F.C. along with his twin brother. He suffered an ACL injury on April and left out for the rest of the season.

Johor Darul Ta'zim II
On 9 November 2013, it was announced that Zaquan was demoted to Johor Darul Ta'zim II in the Malaysia Premier League after one season playing for Johor Darul Ta'zim.

Perak TBG
On 21 December 2016, Zaquan signed a one-year contract with Malaysia Super League club Perak. He scored his first goal for his new club in a 2–2 draw against Felda United. He then converted a penalty against Selangor FA in a 1–0 victory against the Red Giants.

Kuala Lumpur FA
On 5 December 2017, Zaquan signed a contract with newly promoted side Kuala Lumpur. He made his debut and scored his first goal for the club in a dramatic 4–3 victory against Kedah FA. He scored his second goal for the club in a dramatic Klang Valley Derby during the 2018 Malaysia FA Cup quarter finals. Despite KL winning 3–0, they eventually lost on penalties (8–7).

Negeri Sembilan FC
It was reported by the Malaysian news site Utusan Malaysia that Zaquan has signed for Negeri Sembilan FC in December 2020.  Negeri Sembilan FC is a rebrand of Negeri Sembilan FA football team, the team which he played his first professional football for. In 2021, he appeared as the model on the advertisement for the Negeri Sembilan FC's jerseys for the 2021 Malaysian league season.

International career

Youth
Zaquan has been representing Malaysia since he was 14 years old, with his twin brother Mohd Aidil Zafuan Abdul Radzak. He was part of the Malaysia youth squad for 2004 AFC Youth Championship. He was then called up by coach K. Rajagopal in the 2006 AFC Youth Championship qualifier against Myanmar. He scored 2 goals in the qualifier to take Malaysia into their second appearance in a row to the 2006 AFC Youth Championship held in India. However, he didn't make it into the tournament because of an injury.

Malaysia U23
Zaquan was called up by Malaysia U23 national coach B. Sathianathan during the 2008 Olympic games qualifier fourth group match against Hong Kong, after he recovered from an injury. During the 2007 Merdeka Tournament, Zaquan scored 3 goals, one of them in the final against Myanmar. Malaysia beat Myanmar 3–1 and took the trophy for the first time since last winning it in 1993. He was then chosen for the 2007 Southeast Asian Games. Malaysia however failed to advanced after a draw against rivals Singapore.

Senior
Zaquan made his senior debut against Bahrain in the 2010 FIFA World Cup qualifier on 2007. Malaysia lost their first match of the qualifier 4–1 before drawing 0–0 at Shah Alam. He was a regular with the national team from 2008 until 2010 and have played in 2008 AFF Cup and 2011 Asian Cup qualifiers in 2009. He missed the 2010 and 2012 AFF Cup due to an injury. He return to the national team in 2016 under Ong Kim Swee and listed for the 2016 AFF Cup.

On 24 March 2018, he was called up by Tan Cheng Hoe and selected as the captain for the match against Lebanon in the 2019 AFC Asian Cup qualifiers, where Malaysia lost 2–1. In the friendly match against Bhutan, he scored 4 goals in the 7–0 victory, ending Malaysia's 2 years and 12 games winless run. He was chosen as captain for the Malaysian team in their AFF Cup 2018 campaign where Malaysia finish as the runners up.

Zaquan also represented the Malaysia XI against European league team who did a tour to Asia such as Chelsea in 2008 and Manchester United in 2009.

Career statistics

Club

International

International goals
Scores and results list Malaysia's goal tally first.

1 Not FIFA 'A' International match.

Honours

Club
Negeri Sembilan
Sukma Games: 2004
Malaysia Super League: 2005-06
Malaysia Premier League: 2021
Malaysia Cup: 2009, 2011
Malaysia FA Cup: 2010

ATM
Malaysia Premier League: 2012

Kedah 
 Malaysia FA Cup: 2019

International
Malaysia U-23
Merdeka Cup: 2007
Southeast Asian Games: 2009

Malaysia
AFF Championship runner-up: 2018

Individual
FAM Football Awards Best Young Players: 2006-07

References

External links
Mohd Zaquan Adha Abdul Radzak's Profile at F.A.M. website

1987 births
Living people
People from Negeri Sembilan
Identical twins
Malaysian twins
Malaysian footballers
Malaysian people of Minangkabau descent
Malaysian people of Indonesian descent
Malaysia international footballers
Negeri Sembilan FA players
Negeri Sembilan FC players
ATM FA players
Johor Darul Ta'zim F.C. players
Malaysia Super League players
Association football midfielders
Association football forwards
Malaysian people of Malay descent
Southeast Asian Games gold medalists for Malaysia
Southeast Asian Games medalists in football
Competitors at the 2009 Southeast Asian Games